Psychroflexus planctonicus  is a Gram-negative, strictly aerobic, moderately halophilic, and non-motile bacteria from the genus of Psychroflexus which has been isolated from the Lake Xiaochaidan in Qaidam Basin in the Qinghai Province in China.

References

Further reading

External links
Type strain of Psychroflexus planctonicus at BacDive -  the Bacterial Diversity Metadatabase

Flavobacteria
Bacteria described in 2016